

auto garage in Dubai 

Everyone wants to locate an excellent, sincere, and trusted local storage which gives them affordable every time. So how do you begin locating one locally? The good news, it is probable if you merely follow these 4 easy steps. This in turn removes the odds of you utilizing the auto garage in Dubai improper types that are likely to charge you on the top. And the first faltering step is to have particular recommendations, particularly from the ones that push around in a similar design and label of the vehicle as yours.

Stage 1 - How to get particular Vehicle Repairs recommendations

Which means you drive around in a style of car that few possess or drive. Therefore how can go about getting personal guidelines? Properly, it is now very much easier. Only mail or text friends, family members and perform colleagues to inquire further when they know of anybody who drives the same design and label of the car as yours locally. Let them have your details as well as state you're looking for a trusted garage to service or to accomplish some car repairs on your car or truck in the area area. Should they don't know anyone, encourage them to question their friends. They in turn might know someone. As the saying goes, you are no more than 6 persons far from the individual you intend to contact or speak to. Test it out. It works. You'll be amazed at the results. Today on to the next step.

Step 2 - At this point, you have a prospect of possible garages to utilize for your automobile repairs.

What exact issues should at this point you ask those who have only recommended specific storage for a few car fixes? Here are some to get you started:

1. What do they like about vehicle repairs in particular? Find out the causes why.

2. How long have they been utilizing the storage for servicing and for automobile fixes?

3. What did they do last in their car? Have they had any other vehicle repairs done using the same storage?

4. What was the support like? Any feedback? How was the car returned in their mind? Was it clear and neat?

5. Was it fixed in the afternoon and during the time it was booked? Or do the automobile repairs always over-run?

6. Were they knowledgeable of any other additional car repairs that must be done before they certainly were actually moved out? Did the auto fixes storage to give them an estimate during the time and most importantly did they hold to it?

7. Was the account itemized with an in-depth dysfunction for the vehicle fixes done including components replaced? Are there any hidden terrible surprises added to the statement they knew nothing about?

8. Did the auto garage press the service guide and were they any other dilemmas?

9. How did they guide their vehicle in? Was there a long waiting amount of over a week to book their vehicle in etc?

10. The storage itself was it well-run, tidy, clear, and well-maintained? What was the general attitude of the staff? Were they courteous and valuable?

11. Have they had any reason to go back to the garage to have a number of the car repairs viewed again?

Step 3 - Now to see these auto repairs/garages in your candidate

You now have a prospect of the possible garages to use for the urgently required automobile repairs. You now have to quickly veterinarian many of these out. First phone the automobile fixes up and ask them for something estimate for your product and model of car.

1. Just how long were you kept waiting on the device before it absolutely was solved?

2. Were they particular and step-by-step about what is included within the service and what isn't?

Typically, how the party team operates and how they cope with the public ( i.e. client care) reflects how vehicle fixes are now being run. Sure, the individual might be having a poor day. But even if they are, they should be skilled and at their utmost when coping with the public.

After several days, at this point, you need to do an instant stop-by at the vehicle fixes itself. It's most readily useful never to move first thing each morning as you intend to see the way the car repairs work properly at an active time. Just visit the party table and again ask them for an estimate on the offering of one's car. Let them have your car or truck facts etc. This is today your possibility to ask some other questions you might however have:

If any function is performed on your car or truck, just how long is guaranteed in full? It is always most useful to make use of a genuine example to have all the details. This really is so there can be no misunderstanding.

Inquire further about what is within the company and what isn't. You can now examine that as to the was said on the phone earlier. Are they any variations? If you will find it, question them why this is actually the case.

Learn wherever you acquire the vehicle after it's been serviced. You need your vehicle to be parked and held in a secure place. And not down a thin side street where cars have problem parking and passing.

As part of the small speech, inquire further how long they've been working at the car repairs. Cause them on and observe how they react to your comment "This indicates to become a really helpful place etc";.If they claim yes it is, ask them just how long a lot of the team stays. Question what training they have had many recently.

Once you have completed the reception, browse around generally:

1. Watch how telephone messages are taken. Can it be done carefully or simply offer a bit of report and so forth?

2. Is most of the paperwork and documentation held in an orderly means for each vehicle?

3. Will be the detect panels cleaned and updated?

Review everything including how you're generally treated.

Step 4 - Today for the ultimate test.

Once you've performed the exact same for all the different vehicle fixes in your shortlist you can now choose which auto fixes to choose:

1. Most readily useful to provide your chosen garage a small vehicle repair job first if you're able to, to see how they do it. What several also do at the same time frame is to mention these were encouraged by such and such individuals with therefore and so vehicle who also employs them.

2. If multiple people have provided you personal advice for that garage also note their names. In this way, the automobile storage understands that you will be a significant customer. Using this method you assure them they will do great work rather than the chance you returning to their different present customers and telling them otherwise. Perform them at their very own game.

Finally, as soon as you have transformed your car or truck to a brand new one, particularly to a different product and style of car, you may want to get another suitable automobile repair to accomplish the offering and repairs to your car in the future. But, perhaps you are lucky in that the vehicle repairs you are presently using also can do all of the servicing and any essential repairs on your brand-new car. Discover today if here is the situation, and maybe not when you'll need storage in a hurry.

Manhattan is the original motion picture soundtrack to Woody Allen's 1979 film Manhattan with music by George Gershwin. It was performed by the New York Philharmonic under Zubin Mehta and the Buffalo Philharmonic Orchestra under Michael Tilson Thomas. It was nominated for Best Soundtrack in the 33rd British Academy Film Awards.

Background
Normally, Allen's finding and adding music to a film would be done during the editing process. However, in the case of this soundtrack, Allen has said he knew beforehand exactly what he wanted: "Sometimes I know in advance. When I made Manhattan, for example, I knew I was going to use this Gershwin music". Fellow Brooklynite Gershwin's 1924 composition Rhapsody in Blue, the opening musical number of the film, does seem perfectly apt for the film, as the idea for the song came to Gershwin on a train journey to Boston. Gershwin describes as "a musical kaleidoscope of America, of our vast melting pot, our unduplicated national pep, our blues, our metropolitan madness." It is that Metropolitan Madness that makes it work so well in Woody Allen's Manhattan. Used in the extended opening homage, it is the perfect soundtrack to New York at all hours.

The inspiration behind the soundtrack came to Allen when he was listening to the CBS Masterworks LP of Gershwin overtures, titled Gershwin on Broadway, in arrangements by Don Rose, recorded in 1976 by Michael Tilson Thomas and the Buffalo Philharmonic Orchestra (BPO). This LP included six Gershwin overtures: Girl Crazy, Of Thee I Sing, Let 'Em Eat Cake, Oh, Kay!, Funny Face, and Strike Up the Band. In order to secure the legal rights, Allen's producers sent each BPO musician a check for an extra recording session that would never take place.

Gershwin is widely considered to be a quintessential American composer whose music is culturally defining for many Americans – especially New Yorkers. The soundtrack contains a mix of Gershwin's more famous compositions (Rhapsody in Blue, "Someone to Watch Over Me" and "Embraceable You") and several lesser-known pieces. There is also variety in the instrumentation, with some scored for the full orchestra and some for smaller ensembles ("Mine" and "Love Is Here to Stay").

Track listing
The music of the film was performed by the New York Philharmonic, Buffalo Philharmonic Orchestra and pianist Gary Graffman. The arrangements were mostly done by Tom Pierson.

 New York Philharmonic
 Rhapsody in Blue 
 "Mine" (from Let 'Em Eat Cake)
 "Love Is Here to Stay" (from The Goldwyn Follies)
 "Love is Sweeping the Country" (from Of Thee I Sing)
 "Land of the Gay Caballero" (from Girl Crazy)
 "Sweet and Low Down" (from Tip-Toes)
 "I've Got a Crush on You" (from Strike Up The Band)
 "Do-Do-Do" (from Oh, Kay!)
 "'S Wonderful" (from Funny Face)
 "Oh, Lady Be Good!" (from Lady, Be Good!)
 "Strike Up the Band" (from Strike Up The Band)
 "Embraceable You" (from Girl Crazy)
 Buffalo Philharmonic
 "Someone to Watch Over Me" (from Oh, Kay!)
 "He Loves and She Loves" (from Funny Face)
 "But Not for Me" (from Girl Crazy)
A part of the first movement of Mozart's Symphony No. 40 is heard in a concert scene.

Charts

Developments
After the success of Manhattan, the original BPO-Gershwin LP, Gershwin on Broadway, was later issued on CD (Sony MK2240) which also features the New York Philharmonic.

References 

1979 soundtrack albums
George Gershwin in film